Henrik von Eckermann (born 25 May 1981 in Nyköping, Sweden) is a Swedish Olympic show jumping rider. He has competed at three Summer Olympics (in 2012, 2016 and 2020). His best individual Olympic placements came in the 2020 Olympics in Tokyo when he won gold in the team and placed 4th in the individual competition.

Henrik participated at the 2014 World Equestrian Games and at four European Show Jumping Championships (in 2009, 2011, 2013 and 2015). He won a team bronze at the 2013 Europeans held in Herning, Denmark. Meanwhile, his current best individual result is 5th place from the 2011 European Championships. Henrik also participated at three editions of the Show Jumping World Cup finals (in 2013, 2016 and 2017). His biggest success came in 2017, when he placed 3rd in the finals, behind McLain Ward and Romain Duguet.

References 

Living people
1981 births
Equestrians at the 2012 Summer Olympics
Equestrians at the 2016 Summer Olympics
Equestrians at the 2020 Summer Olympics
Swedish male equestrians
Olympic equestrians of Sweden
Swedish people of German descent
People from Nyköping Municipality
Medalists at the 2020 Summer Olympics
Olympic medalists in equestrian
Olympic gold medalists for Sweden
Sportspeople from Södermanland County
20th-century Swedish people
21st-century Swedish people